The New Mexico Highlands Cowboys and Cowgirls are the athletic teams that represent New Mexico Highlands University, located in Las Vegas, New Mexico, in NCAA Division II intercollegiate sports. The Cowboys and Cowgirls compete as members of the Rocky Mountain Athletic Conference for all 11 varsity sports.

History
The Men's Cross-Country team placed 10th in the nation at the 1998 NCAA Division II National Championship. In the 2008–09 season, the NMHU men's basketball team broke the NCAA record for turnaround wins in all divisions. They went from 1–28 to 20–8 and winning the West Division Regular Season Championship of the RMAC. They were led by head coach Joe Harge and tri-captains Chris Dunn, Roman "Electric" Andrade, and Rashad Peterson. In 2010, NMHU wrestler Seth Wright won the NCAA Division II National Championship at 125 lbs.

Varsity sports

Men's sports
 Baseball
 Basketball
 Cross Country
 Football
 Wrestling

Women's sports
 Basketball
 Cross Country
 Soccer
 Softball
 Track & Field
 Volleyball

National championships

Team

Notable alumni
 Charlie Cowan, NFL – All Pro Tackle
 Bill Dinwiddie, NBA player
 Carl Garrett, AFL/NFL – 1969 AFL Rookie of the Year
 Len Garrett, NFL player
 Eddie Guerrero (1967–2005), WWE wrestler
 Lionel Taylor, NFL – Leading Pass Receiver
 Don Woods, NFL Player
 Kevon Williams, USA Rugby 7s
 Anthony Edwards, NFL player

References

External links